Eduardo Castelló Vilanova (4 March 1940 – 31 October 2020) was a Spanish professional racing cyclist. He rode in three editions of the Tour de France and eight of the Vuelta a España, notably winning a stage in 1968, as well as finishing 13th in the 1972 edition. He also won the Spanish National Road Race Championships and the Vuelta Asturias in 1971, as well as the Vuelta a los Valles Mineros in 1968.

Castelló died on 31 October 2020, at the age of 80.

Major results

1965
 7th Overall Critérium du Dauphiné Libéré
1967
 1st Subida a Arrate
1968
 1st  Overall Vuelta a los Valles Mineros
1st Stage 2a
 1st Stage 14 Vuelta a España
 1st Stage 6 Vuelta a la Comunidad Valenciana
 8th Overall Volta a Catalunya
1969
 2nd Subida a Arrate
 5th Overall Tour of the Basque Country
1970
 2nd Subida a Arrate
1971
 1st  Road race, National Road Championships
 1st  Overall Vuelta Asturias
1st Stage 2
1972
 2nd Gran Premio Nuestra Señora de Oro
 6th Overall Volta a Catalunya

References

External links
 

1940 births
2020 deaths
Spanish male cyclists
People from La Vall d'Uixó
Sportspeople from the Province of Castellón
Spanish Vuelta a España stage winners
Cyclists from the Valencian Community